Svinninge may refer to:

 Svinninge, Holbæk Municipality, a town in Denmark
 Svinninge Municipality, a former municipality
 , Denmark
 Svinninge, Sweden, town in Sweden
 Svindinge, a village in Nyborg, Southern Denmark, Denmark